Uday Khemka is an Indian angel investor, entrepreneur, and philanthropist. He is known for contributions to the climate change sector in India and his work with SUN Group. He has collaborated with Bill Clinton, Narendra Modi, and other political figures in the field of climate change.

References

20th-century Indian businesspeople
Indian philanthropists
Harvard Business School alumni
Year of birth missing (living people)
Living people
Angel investors